Caroline Aparecida Trentini (born 6 July 1987) is a Brazilian model.

Early life 
Trentini was born in Panambi, Brazil. Trentini is the youngest daughter of Lourdes and Jacó Trentini, who died when she was one year old. Her older sisters are Franciele and Elen. Although having never worked before, Lourdes got a job as a public employee when Jacó died and raised her daughters single-handedly.

Career

Discovery and breakthrough 
In 2000, Trentini was discovered walking down a street in her hometown by an agent, the same one who scouted Gisele Bündchen, and soon afterward she moved to São Paulo, a common destination for young Brazilian models. Her modeling career immediately took off, and after a year, Trentini moved again, this time to New York City. She did not speak English but quickly learned the new language. Trentini's breakthrough came when designer Marc Jacobs cast her in his Marc by Marc Jacobs ad campaign, photographed by Juergen Teller.

She has appeared on the covers of magazines ELLE, Harper's Bazaar and Vogue, among others.

In 2007, she was the face of Gucci Cruise, Oscar de la Renta, Dolce & Gabbana Animelier, DSquared² and Mulberry. Currently, she is the face on DKNY and Carlos Miele.

In the May 2007 issue of American Vogue she was featured on the cover with fellow models: Doutzen Kroes, Jessica Stam, Raquel Zimmermann, Sasha Pivovarova, Agyness Deyn, Coco Rocha, Hilary Rhoda, Chanel Iman, and Lily Donaldson as the "World's Next Top Models." In 2008 casting agent James Scully, who is responsible to pick which model is to score a spot on top runways, says in regards to Trentini:
Trentini made her Victoria's Secret Fashion Show debut in 2005 and also walked the show in 2006 and 2009. She featured as a 'Face of the Moment' in May 2009's US Vogue. In early 2015 Carol Trentini was hired to be the top model of CARRANO, high end top fashion women footwear manufacturer from Brazil (http://www.carrano.com.br & http://www.carranousa.com), for the 2016 Spring Summer and Fall Winter seasons.

Caroline was ranked one of the Top 50 models and she is an industry icon according to Models Dot website.

Personal life 
Trentini dated photographer Victor Demarchelier, son of legendary French photographer Patrick Demarchelier for about three years. Immediately after breaking up with Demarchelier, in early 2010, she got back together with Brazilian photographer Fabio Bartelt, who was her first boyfriend. On 29 October 2011, both Trentini and Bartelt announced they were engaged. On 3 March 2012, Bartelt and Trentini were married on a church in Itajaí, Santa Catarina, Brazil.
They have two sons: Bento Jacob Trentini Bartelt (born 9 August 2013) and Benoah Jacob (born 2 June 2016).

References

External links 

 
 
 
 
 Caroline Trentini – Ford Models

1987 births
Living people
People from Rio Grande do Sul
Brazilian people of Italian descent
Brazilian people of German descent
Brazilian female models
Ford Models models